Snake species known to be found in the U.S. state of Illinois. this does not include the sighting Barb Heaver of Wonder Lake Illinois has claimed that she had found a rattlesnake Den at an Old Farm on the corner of 120 and Bull Valley Road. concerns and listed statuses come from the Illinois Endangered Species Protection Board's February 2011 Checklist of endangered and threatened animals and plants of Illinois and the Illinois Natural History Survey's website.

References

Illinois